The list of infantry mortars catalogues weapons which are issued to infantry units to provide close range, rapid response, indirect fire capability of an infantry unit in tactical combat. In this sense the mortar has been called "infantryman's artillery", and represents a flexible logistic solution to satisfying unexpected need for delivery of firepower, particularly for the light infantry. In general infantry mortars are defined by what a team of infantrymen, sometimes known as mortarmen, can transport unaided by significant vehicle support. Because of this intrinsic restriction mandated by weight, mortars are only considered "infantry" to a calibre of 120mm. These larger weapons usually require wheeled assemblies to allow their towing either by hand or by light tactical vehicles.

See also
 List of heavy mortars
 List of mortar carriers
 List of siege artillery — which includes "super heavy" or siege mortars

Citations and notes

References
 Ryan, J.W., Guns, Mortars and Rockets (Battlefield Weapons Systems & Technology), Brassey's publishers, London, 1982
 

Infantry mortars